Claudio Costamagna (April 10, 1956, Milan) is an Italian banker and businessman. He was Chairman of Cassa Depositi e Prestiti from July 2015 to July 2018.

Claudio Costamagna is Chairman of CC & Soci Srl and sits on the board of FTI Consulting, a business advisory group listed on the NYSE. Moreover, Mr Costamagna is a member of the board of Finarvedi, holding company of the Arvedi Group, Italiana Petroli and Salini Costruttori, holding company through which the Salini family controls Webuild, a leading Italian construction company.

Biography
Born in Milan in 1956, Claudio Costamagna attended the Ecole Européenne in Brussels before returning to Italy and enrolling at Università Commerciale Luigi Bocconi. In 1981 he was awarded a degree in business economics. He then began his career in the financial control area of Citibank, before moving in 1985 to Montedison, where he was Head of Corporate Finance for the holding company.

Career at Goldman Sachs
In 1988 Costamagna joined Goldman Sachs, initially as head of Investment Banking Italy, then becoming Country Head for Italy and Chairman of Goldman Sachs.
In 1999, he was appointed Co-Head of the Investment Banking division for Europe, the Middle East and Africa and a member of the European Management Committee and the Global Partnership Committee. Between 2004 and 2006, year in which he left the Group, Costamagna was Chairman of the Investment Banking division for Europe, Middle East and Africa.

After Goldman Sachs
In 2006 he founded CC & Soci, a financial advisory company, where he serves as Chairman and in 2011 he founded Advise Only, a firm specialised in personal finance and in online asset management advisory.

From 2012 to January 2018 he was Chairman of AAA-Advanced Accelerator Applications, a European pharmaceutical group founded in 2003. The company focused on the development of diagnostic and therapeutic products in the field of nuclear medicine and was acquired by Novartis in January 2018 for 3.9 billion dollars. Mr. Costamagna was also Chairman of Salini-Impregilo, Italy’s leading infrastructure construction group from 2012 to July 2015.

Other positions
Over the years, Claudio Costamagna has also served as a director of Luxottica, Bulgari, Il Sole 24 Ore Group, Autogrill and DeA Capital, all companies listed on the Italian Stock Exchange. Moreover, he served as a board member of Virgin Group Holding  and Reuters Breakingviews.

Recognitions
In 2004 he was selected as “Bocconi Alumnus of the Year” by the ALUB association, of which all graduates of Università Commerciale Luigi Bocconi are members.
In may 2017, Claudio Costamagna was selected for the Guido Carli award.

Notes

1956 births
Living people
Italian bankers
Goldman Sachs people
Businesspeople from Milan
Bocconi University alumni